Joseph William Holehouse (1836–1900) was a member of the Wisconsin State Assembly.

Biography
Holehouse was born on July 5, 1836 in Stalybridge, England. His father, Joseph Holehouse (1814–1875), brought the family over to Wisconsin, purchasing land there in 1848. Joseph William married Wilhelmina Bridget "Millie" Larkins (1848–1925). They would have seven children. Holehouse died on March 13, 1900, in West Bend, Wisconsin.

Career
Holehouse was a member of the Assembly in 1881 and 1882. Additionally, he was Assessor of Barton, Wisconsin. He was a Democrat.

References

1836 births
1900 deaths
People from Stalybridge
English emigrants to the United States
People from Barton, Wisconsin
Democratic Party members of the Wisconsin State Assembly
19th-century American politicians